The 2004 AAPT Championships was a tennis tournament played on outdoor hard courts in Adelaide in Australia and was part of the International Series of the 2004 ATP Tour. The tournament ran from 5 through 11 January 2004.

Finals

Singles

 Dominik Hrbatý defeated  Michaël Llodra 6–4, 6–0
 It was Hrbatý's 1st title of the year and the 6th of his career.

Doubles

 Bob Bryan /  Mike Bryan defeated  Arnaud Clément /  Michaël Llodra 7–5, 6–3
 It was Bob Bryan's 1st title of the year and the 15th of his career. It was Mike Bryan's 1st title of the year and the 17th of his career.

External links
 ATP Tournament Profile

AAPT Championships
Next Generation Adelaide International
Aap
2000s in Adelaide
January 2004 sports events in Australia